Craig Goodwin (born 12 February 1974) is a Welsh footballer, who played as a full back in the Football League for Chester City.

References

1974 births
Living people
Welsh footballers
Footballers from Wrexham
Association football fullbacks
Aston Villa F.C. players
Chester City F.C. players
English Football League players
Holywell Town F.C. players